The Nishadha
(IAST: Niṣadha) was a tribe of ancient India that lived in a country of the same name

History
Veerasena was a king of the Nishadha kingdom, and the father of Nala. Nala, the son of Veerasena, became the king after his father. He was the husband of Damayanti, and their story is told in the Mahabharata.

References

External links
 The Naishadha-charita English translation by K. K. Handiqui  [proofread] (includes glossary)

Indo-Aryan peoples